The New Zealand Maritime Museum Hui Te Ananui A Tangaroa is a maritime museum in Auckland, New Zealand. It is located on Hobson Wharf, adjacent to the Viaduct Harbour in central Auckland. It houses exhibitions spanning New Zealand's maritime history, from the first Polynesian explorers and settlers to modern day triumphs at the America's Cup. Its Maori name is  'Te Huiteanaui-A-Tangaroa'  – holder of the treasures of Tangaroa (the Sea God).

History

The museum's founding director was Rodney Wilson, who from 1989 led fundraising efforts to establish the museum, which opened in 1993, the year the America's Cup regatta was held in Auckland. The cost was estimated at NZ$11.1 million. The entrance of the museum incorporates the Launchman's Building, a structure built in 1920 which formerly housed a number of small boating companies. Many of the early maritime collections were long-term loans from Auckland War Memorial Museum.

Collections
The museum cares for a number of collections and permanent exhibitions (as of 2006):
Main exhibitions, concentrating on:
Polynesian, Maori vessels and navigation
European voyages of discovery
Settlement and immigration
Early coastal trading
Whaling and sealing
Modern commercial shipping
Lifeboat, pilotage and coastguard services
Navigation and marine surveying
Maritime art and crafts
Recreation and sporting maritime activities
Maritime trades
Harbour and port history
Collections, documentation:
New Zealand Maritime Index – documents about maritime topics
New Zealand Maritime Record – photos and articles about NZ ships
Northern Steamship Company – website about the historical company
Bill Laxon Maritime Library – photos, charts and other documents
Lighthouses in New Zealand – documentation about lighthouse topics
New Zealand Maritime Firsts – achievements of NZ in maritime areas
Genealogy Documentation – immigration shipping lists, documents
Art collections:
Edmiston Collection
Fraser Collection

Seaworthy ships

In addition to a number of reconstructed or preserved ships in the building itself, the museum also owns a number of vessels that are normally berthed outside of the museum:

Breeze, 1982 reproduction of a brigantine for NZ coastal trade
Puke, late 19th century steam engine tender for coastal and river logging trade
Rapaki steam crane, 1926 floating steam crane, built in Scotland for the Lyttelton Harbour Board. Permanently removed and dismantled in December 2018.  
Ted Ashby, 1993 reproduction of ketch-rigged scow typical, late 19th century northern NZ. Ted Ashby has public sailings every day except Monday.
 Aotearoa One, launched 2013, described on the museum's website as "a modern take on a traditional waka"
Some personnel from the Royal New Zealand Navy are also at times seconded to the museum to assist with maintenance of the ships and exhibition objects.

Extension
A NZ$8 million extension to the northern end of the museum was built in the late 2000s to house a permanent exhibition, Blue Water, Black Magic, about Sir Peter Blake. It includes the original NZL 32 (Black Magic)..

Gallery

References

External links
New Zealand National Maritime Museum (museum homepage)
 Interview with Rodney Wilson, Founding Director of the New Zealand National Maritime Museum, for the Cultural Icons project. Audio and Video

Museums in Auckland
Military and war museums in New Zealand
Maritime museums in New Zealand
Marine art museums
1990s architecture in New Zealand
Auckland CBD
Auckland waterfront
Waitematā Harbour